Rani Ahmad Yahya (born September 12, 1984) is a Brazilian mixed martial artist and BJJ practitioner. He won the 66 kg division of the prestigious ADCC Submission Wrestling World Championship in April 2007. He currently fights in the Bantamweight division of the Ultimate Fighting Championship.

Background
Yahya was born to a Syrian father and Brazilian mother. He trained judo, taekwondo and karate in his childhood, finding Brazilian jiu-jitsu at the age of 11.

Mixed martial arts career

World Extreme Cagefighting
Yahya made his WEC debut against former TKO Major League MMA featherweight champion Mark Hominick at WEC 28 on May 3, 2007. Yahya defeated Hominick in the first round with a rear naked choke.

He fought and lost to Chase Beebe via unanimous decision for the WEC bantamweight championship at WEC 30 on September 5, 2007, and earned Fight of the Night bonus.

On November 5, 2008 at WEC 36, Yahya fought Yoshiro Maeda and won via Submission in the first round and earned the Submission of the Night bônus.

Yahya fought former WEC Bantamweight Champion Eddie Wineland on the undercard of WEC 40 on April 5, 2009. He won via Submission in the first round and earned the Submission of the Night bônus.

Yahya was scheduled to fight Kenji Osawa on August 9, 2009 at WEC 42, but due to a foot injury suffered by Osawa, he was replaced by John Hosman. Yahya submitted Hosman with a north–south choke in the first round and earned his third consecutive Submission of the Night bonus.

Yahya fought Joseph Benavidez on December 19, 2009 at WEC 45. He lost the fight via TKO in the first round.

Yahya faced Takeya Mizugaki on April 24, 2010 at WEC 48. He lost the fight via unanimous decision.

Ultimate Fighting Championship
On October 28, 2010, World Extreme Cagefighting merged with the Ultimate Fighting Championship. As part of the merger, all WEC fighters were brought over to compete in the 2 new weight divisions.

Yahya was expected to face Chan Sung Jung on January 22, 2011 at UFC Fight Night 23. However, Jung was forced from the card with an injury. and replaced by Mike Brown. Yahya won the fight via unanimous decision.

Yahya was expected to face Dustin Poirier on June 11, 2011 at UFC 131, but had to pull out of the bout due to injury.

Yahya next faced Chad Mendes on August 6, 2011 at UFC 133.  He lost the fight via unanimous decision.

Yahya was expected to face Jonathan Brookins on February 15, 2012 at UFC on Fuel TV 1, but was forced out of the bout with an injury.

Yahya fought Josh Grispi on August 4, 2012 at UFC on Fox: Shogun vs. Vera, replacing an injured Pablo Garza. Yahya was victorious, defeating Grispi in the first round with a north–south choke.

Yahya faced promotional newcomer Mizuto Hirota on March 3, 2013 at UFC on Fuel TV 8. He won the fight via unanimous decision.

Yahya next faced Josh Clopton on August 3, 2013 at UFC 163. He won the fight via unanimous decision.

Yahya faced promotional newcomer Tom Niinimäki on November 30, 2013 at The Ultimate Fighter 18 Finale. He lost the fight via split decision.

Yahya faced Johnny Bedford in a bantamweight bout on April 11, 2014 at UFC Fight Night 39.  The bout ended in a No Contest as an accidental clash of heads rendered Yahya unable to protect himself, forcing a referee stoppage at 0:39 of round 1.

A rematch with Bedford was expected to take place on June 28, 2014 at UFC Fight Night: Swanson vs. Stephens. However, Yahya was forced out of the bout and replaced by Cody Gibson.

The rescheduled rematch with Bedford eventually took place on September 13, 2014 at UFC Fight Night 51. Yahya won via submission in the second round.

Yahya was expected to face Masanori Kanehara on June 27, 2015 at UFC Fight Night 70.  However, as the event approached, several international fighters experienced travel restrictions due to technical issues within the Bureau of Consular Affairs division of the U.S. State Department which produces travel visas. The issue lead to a major altering of the card as multiple fights were postponed.  Yahya/Kanehara eventually took place on July 15, 2015 at UFC Fight Night 71. Yahya won the fight by split decision.

Yahya next faced touted promotional newcomer Matthew Lopez on July 13, 2016 at UFC Fight Night 91. Yahya won the fight via submission in the third round.

Yahya faced Michinori Tanaka on September 24, 2016 at UFC Fight Night 95. He won the fight via unanimous decision.

Yahya faced Joe Soto on March 11, 2017 at UFC Fight Night 106. He lost the back-and-forth fight via unanimous decision.

Yahya faced Henry Briones on August 5, 2017 at UFC Fight Night: Pettis vs. Moreno. He won the fight via a kimura submission in the first round.

Yahya was expected to face Aljamain Sterling on December 9, 2017 at UFC Fight Night 123. However, Yahya pulled out of the event due to injury.

Yahya faced Russell Doane on February 24, 2018 at UFC on Fox 28. He won the fight via submission in the third round.

Yahya faced Luke Sanders on August 25, 2018 at UFC Fight Night 135. He won the fight via heel hook submission in the first round.

Yahya faced Ricky Simón on February 10, 2019 at UFC 234. He lost the fight via unanimous decision after being knocked down twice.

Yahya faced Enrique Barzola on March 14, 2020 at UFC Fight Night 170. After a back-and-forth three rounds, the judges declared the bout a majority draw decision.

Yahya faced Ray Rodriguez on March 13, 2021, replacing Irwin Rivera, at UFC Fight Night: Edwards vs. Muhammad. After dominating the fight with his takedowns and jiu-jitsu, Yahya won the fight via arm-triangle submission in the second round.

Yahya was scheduled to face Kang Kyung-ho on July 31, 2021 at UFC on ESPN 28. However the bout was cancelled a few hours before happening due to Yahya testing positive for COVID-19.

Yahya faced Kang Kyung-ho on November 20, 2021 at UFC Fight Night 198. He won the bout via unanimous decision.

Yahya was scheduled to face Cody Garbrandt on July 9, 2022, at UFC on ESPN 39. However, Yahya withdrew in mid June due to a neck injury. The bout with Garbrandt was rescheduled and is expected to take place on October 1, 2022 at UFC Fight Night 211. In turn, Yahya withdrew again in mid-September for unknown reasons.

Yahya is scheduled to face  Montel Jackson on April 22, 2023 at UFC Fight Night 222.

Grappling credentials
ADCC World Submission Wrestling Championships

ADCC 2007
–65 kg: 1st Place

ADCC 2005
–65 kg: 2nd Place

ADCC 2003
–65 kg: Quarter finals.

Record of opponents:

Won: Teemu Launis (pts), Mario Delgado (pts), Wagney Fabiano (pts), Marcio Feitosa Souza (pts), Darell Moodley (sub), Bruno 'Chavez' Frazzato (Rear Naked Choke), Baret Yoshida (pts), Leo 'Leozinho' Vieira (Rear Naked Choke), Kohei Yasumi (sub), Jeff Glover (pts)
Lost: Leonardo Viera (pts), Leonardo Viera (pts), Rubens "Cobrinha" Charles (sub)

IBJJJF/CBJJ World Championships

2019
Black Belt Pena Master: 1st Place

2003
Brown Belt Pena: 1st Place

2002
Purple Belt Pluma: 1st Place

1999 Pan-Ams + World Blue Belt : 1st Place

Championships and accomplishments

Mixed martial arts
K-1 HERO'S
2006 K-1 HERO'S Lightweight Grand Prix Semifinalist
TNT
TNT: Vale Tudo 2 Tournament Winner
World Extreme Cagefighting
Submission of the Night (three times) vs.Mark Hominick, Yoshiro Maeda, Eddie Wineland and John Hosman
Fight of the Night (one time) vs. Chase Beebe
Ultimate Fighting Championship
Tied (with Urijah Faber) for the most submission wins in UFC Bantamweight division history (six)

Mixed martial arts record

|-
|Win
|align=center| (1)
|Kang Kyung-ho
|Decision (unanimous)
|UFC Fight Night: Vieira vs. Tate
|
|align=center|3
|align=center|5:00
|Las Vegas, Nevada, United States
|
|-
|Win
|align=center| (1)
|Ray Rodriguez
|Submission (arm-triangle choke)
|UFC Fight Night: Edwards vs. Muhammad
|
|align=center|2
|align=center|3:09
|Las Vegas, Nevada, United States
|
|-
|Draw
|align=center| (1)
|Enrique Barzola
|Draw (majority)
|UFC Fight Night: Lee vs. Oliveira 
|
|align=center|3
|align=center|5:00
|Brasília, Brazil
| 
|-
|Loss
|align=center|26–10 (1)
|Ricky Simón
|Decision (unanimous)
|UFC 234
|
|align=center|3
|align=center|5:00
|Melbourne, Australia 
|
|-
|Win
|align=center|26–9 (1)
|Luke Sanders
|Submission (heel hook)
|UFC Fight Night: Gaethje vs. Vick 
|
|align=center|1
|align=center|1:31
|Lincoln, Nebraska, United States
|
|-
|Win
|align=center|25–9 (1)
|Russell Doane
|Submission (arm-triangle choke)
|UFC on Fox: Emmett vs. Stephens 
|
|align=center|3
|align=center|2:32
|Orlando, Florida, United States
|
|-
|Win
|align=center|24–9 (1)
|Henry Briones
|Submission (kimura)
|UFC Fight Night: Pettis vs. Moreno
|
|align=center|1
|align=center|2:01
|Mexico City, Mexico
|
|-
|Loss
|align=center|23–9 (1)
|Joe Soto
|Decision (unanimous)
|UFC Fight Night: Belfort vs. Gastelum
|
|align=center|3
|align=center|5:00
|Fortaleza, Brazil
| 
|-
|Win
|align=center|23–8 (1) 
|Michinori Tanaka
| Decision (unanimous)
|UFC Fight Night: Cyborg vs. Länsberg
|
|align=center|3 
|align=center|5:00
|Brasília, Brazil
|  
|-
|Win
|align=center|22–8 (1)
|Matthew Lopez
|Submission (arm-triangle choke)
|UFC Fight Night: McDonald vs. Lineker
|
|align=center|3
|align=center|4:19
|Sioux Falls, South Dakota, United States
| 
|-
| Win
| align=center| 21–8 (1)
| Masanori Kanehara
| Decision (split)
| UFC Fight Night: Mir vs. Duffee
| 
| align=center| 3
| align=center| 5:00
| San Diego, California, United States
|
|-
| Win
| align=center| 20–8 (1)
| Johnny Bedford
| Submission (kimura)
| UFC Fight Night: Bigfoot vs. Arlovski
| 
| align=center| 2
| align=center| 2:04
| Brasília, Brazil
| 
|-
| NC
| align=center| 19–8 (1)
| Johnny Bedford
| NC (accidental headbutt)
| UFC Fight Night: Nogueira vs. Nelson
| 
| align=center| 1
| align=center| 0:39
| Abu Dhabi, United Arab Emirates
| 
|-
| Loss
| align=center| 19–8
| Tom Niinimäki
| Decision (split)
| The Ultimate Fighter: Team Rousey vs. Team Tate Finale
| 
| align=center| 3
| align=center| 5:00
| Las Vegas, Nevada, United States
| 
|-
| Win
| align=center| 19–7
| Josh Clopton
| Decision (unanimous)
| UFC 163
| 
| align=center| 3
| align=center| 5:00
| Rio de Janeiro, Brazil
| 
|-
| Win
| align=center| 18–7
| Mizuto Hirota
| Decision (unanimous)
| UFC on Fuel TV: Silva vs. Stann
| 
| align=center| 3
| align=center| 5:00
| Saitama, Japan
| 
|-
| Win
| align=center| 17–7
| Josh Grispi
| Submission (north-south choke)
| UFC on Fox: Shogun vs. Vera
| 
| align=center| 1
| align=center| 3:15
| Los Angeles, California, United States
| 
|-
| Loss
| align=center| 16–7
| Chad Mendes
| Decision (unanimous)
| UFC 133
| 
| align=center| 3
| align=center| 5:00
| Philadelphia, Pennsylvania, United States
| 
|-
| Win
| align=center| 16–6
| Mike Brown
| Decision (unanimous)
| UFC: Fight For The Troops 2
| 
| align=center| 3
| align=center| 5:00
| Fort Hood, Texas, United States
| 
|-
| Loss
| align=center| 15–6
| Takeya Mizugaki
| Decision (unanimous)
| WEC 48
| 
| align=center| 3
| align=center| 5:00
| Sacramento, California, United States
| 
|-
| Loss
| align=center| 15–5
| Joseph Benavidez
| TKO (punches)
| WEC 45
| 
| align=center| 1
| align=center| 1:35
| Las Vegas, Nevada, United States
| 
|-
| Win
| align=center| 15–4
| John Hosman
| Submission (north-south choke)
| WEC 42
| 
| align=center| 1
| align=center| 2:08
| Las Vegas, Nevada, United States
| 
|-
| Win
| align=center| 14–4
| Eddie Wineland
| Submission (rear-naked choke)
| WEC 40
| 
| align=center| 1
| align=center| 1:07
| Chicago, Illinois, United States
| 
|-
| Win
| align=center| 13–4
| Yoshiro Maeda
| Submission (guillotine choke)
| WEC 36
| 
| align=center| 1
| align=center| 3:30
| Hollywood, Florida, United States
| 
|-
| Loss
| align=center| 12–4
| Norifumi Yamamoto
| TKO (punches and soccer kicks)
| K-1 Premium 2007 Dynamite!!
| 
| align=center| 2
| align=center| 3:11
| Osaka, Japan
| 
|-
| Loss
| align=center| 12–3
| Chase Beebe
| Decision (unanimous)
| WEC 30
| 
| align=center| 5
| align=center| 5:00
| Las Vegas, Nevada, United States
| 
|-
| Win
| align=center| 12–2
| Mark Hominick
| Submission (rear-naked choke)
| WEC 28
| 
| align=center| 1
| align=center| 1:19
| Las Vegas, Nevada, United States
|
|-
| Win
| align=center| 11–2
| Louie Moreno
| Submission (guillotine choke)
| PFC 2: Fast and Furious
| 
| align=center| 1
| align=center| 0:23
| Lemoore, California, United States
| 
|-
| Loss
| align=center| 10–2
| Gesias Cavalcante
| Submission (guillotine choke)
| Hero's 7
| 
| align=center| 1
| align=center| 0:39
| Yokohama, Japan
| 
|-
| Win
| align=center| 10–1
| Kazuya Yasuhiro
| Submission (D'Arce choke)
| Hero's 6
| 
| align=center| 1
| align=center| 1:08
| Tokyo, Japan
| 
|-
| Win
| align=center| 9–1
| Eben Kaneshiro
| Submission (Ezekiel choke)
| UAGF: Kaos on Kampus
| 
| align=center| 3
| align=center| N/A
| Los Angeles, California, United States
| 
|-
| Win
| align=center| 8–1
| Ryuki Ueyama
| Decision (majority)
| Hero's 5
| 
| align=center| 2
| align=center| 5:00
| Tokyo, Japan
| 
|-
| Win
| align=center| 7–1
| Takumi Yano
| Technical Submission (triangle choke)
| MARS
| 
| align=center| 3
| align=center| 2:14
| Tokyo, Japan
| 
|-
| Win
| align=center| 6–1
| Taiyo Nakahara
| Submission (north-south choke)
| GCM: D.O.G. 4
| 
| align=center| 1
| align=center| 1:59
| Tokyo, Japan
| 
|-
| Win
| align=center| 5–1
| Fabio Alves
| Submission (arm-triangle choke)
| K-1 Brazil: Next Generation
| 
| align=center| 1
| align=center| N/A
| Goiás, Brazil
| 
|-
| Loss
| align=center| 4–1
| Fredson Paixao
| Decision
| Jungle Fight 2
| 
| align=center| 3
| align=center| 5:00
| Manaus, Brazil
| 
|-
| Win
| align=center| 4–0
| Luciano Santos
| Submission (keylock)
|rowspan=3| TNT: Vale Tudo 2
|rowspan=3| 
| align=center| N/A
| align=center| N/A
|rowspan=3| Goiânia, Brazil
| 
|-
| Win
| align=center| 3–0
| Muzila Muzila
| Submission (armbar)
| align=center| N/A
| align=center| N/A
| 
|-
| Win
| align=center| 2–0
| Fabio Alves
| Submission (Peruvian necktie)
| align=center| N/A
| align=center| N/A
| 
|-
| Win
| align=center| 1–0
| Junior Peba
| Submission (arm-triangle choke)
| Kallifas Vale Tudo
| 
| align=center| 1
| align=center| 1:30
| Goiânia, Brazil
|

See also
 List of current UFC fighters
 List of male mixed martial artists

References

External links
 
 

1984 births
Living people
Brazilian male mixed martial artists
Bantamweight mixed martial artists
Featherweight mixed martial artists
Lightweight mixed martial artists
Mixed martial artists utilizing Muay Thai
Mixed martial artists utilizing Brazilian jiu-jitsu
Brazilian Muay Thai practitioners
Brazilian practitioners of Brazilian jiu-jitsu
People awarded a black belt in Brazilian jiu-jitsu
Sportspeople from Brasília
Brazilian people of Syrian descent
Brazilian expatriate sportspeople in the United States
Ultimate Fighting Championship male fighters